André Luís Gomes Simões (born 16 December 1989) is a Portuguese professional footballer who plays as a midfielder for Primeira Liga club Famalicão.

Club career

Portugal
Born in Matosinhos, Simões played with three clubs as a youth, including FC Porto from ages 8 to 14. He first appeared as a senior for Padroense FC, competing two seasons in the third division and one in the fourth.

In the summer of 2011, Simões signed with C.D. Santa Clara of the Segunda Liga. He played 39 games and scored once in his second year, helping the Azores team to finish in 11th position.

Simões joined fellow second-tier side Moreirense F.C. in late June 2013, helping to a return to the Primeira Liga after one year by contributing two goals and nearly 2,800 minutes of action. He made his debut in the Portuguese top flight on 17 August 2014, playing the full 90 minutes in a 1–0 away win against C.D. Nacional.

AEK Athens
On 30 January 2015, before the campaign was over, Simões agreed to a two-year contract with AEK Athens F.C. which was made effective on 1 July. On 19 March 2016, he agreed to an extension until 30 June 2019, with a buy-out clause of €7.5 million. On 10 December of that year, he scored his first goal in a 4–0 home victory over Levadiakos F.C. in the Super League Greece.

On 24 August 2017, Simões helped his team defeat Club Brugge KV in the second leg of the play-off round of the UEFA Europa League, netting twice and winning a penalty in a 3–0 home win. On 26 November 2018, however, following a league defeat to Panetolikos FC, AEK owner Dimitris Melissanidis engaged in a heated conversation with three players, ostracising Vasilis Lampropoulos, Simões and Anastasios Bakasetas from the team; in his press-conference ahead of the upcoming UEFA Champions League game against AFC Ajax, head coach Marinos Ouzounidis all but confirmed that the trio had ceased to be part of his plans.

Career statistics

Club

Honours
Moreirense
Segunda Liga: 2013–14

AEK Athens
Super League Greece: 2017–18
Greek Football Cup: 2015–16

Individual
Super League Greece Team of the Year: 2017–18

References

External links

1989 births
Living people
Sportspeople from Matosinhos
Portuguese footballers
Association football midfielders
Primeira Liga players
Liga Portugal 2 players
Segunda Divisão players
Padroense F.C. players
C.D. Santa Clara players
Moreirense F.C. players
F.C. Famalicão players
Super League Greece players
AEK Athens F.C. players
Portuguese expatriate footballers
Expatriate footballers in Greece
Portuguese expatriate sportspeople in Greece